Hypertropha tortriciformis is a moth in the family Depressariidae. It was described by Jean Baptiste Boisduval and Achille Guenée in 1852. It is found in Australia, where it has been recorded from Tasmania, the Northern Territory, Queensland, New South Wales, Victoria, South Australia and Western Australia.

The wingspan is about 20 mm. The forewings are brown with a pale speckled crossline across, and several dark spots and patches. The hindwings are bright yellow with black margins.

The larvae feed on new shoots of Angophora and Eucalyptus species.

References

Moths described in 1852
Hypertropha